Parris Laurie (born 9 December 1994) is a retired Australian rules footballer who played for Fremantle and West Coast in the AFL Women's (AFLW).

AFLW career
Laurie was drafted by Fremantle with their fifth selection and fiftieth overall in the 2018 AFL Women's draft. She made her debut in the four point win against Melbourne at Casey Fields in the opening round of the 2019 season.

In April 2019, Laurie joined crosstown rivals West Coast for their inaugural season.
In June 2022, Laurie retired from football.

Personal life
Her brother Jesse Laurie plays football for Claremont in the West Australian Football League and was drafted by Port Adelaide in the 2009 AFL rookie draft, but never played a senior game in the Australian Football League.

References

External links 

1994 births
Living people
Fremantle Football Club (AFLW) players
Australian rules footballers from Western Australia
West Coast Eagles (AFLW) players